The 1980 Senior League World Series took place from August 18–23 in Gary, Indiana, United States. Pingtung, Taiwan defeated Kaneohe, Hawaii in the championship game. It was Taiwan's ninth straight championship.

Teams

Results

References

Senior League World Series
Senior League World Series
1980 in sports in Indiana